Dali railway station may refer to:

 Dali railway station (Yunnan), in Yunnan, China
 Dali railway station (Shaanxi), on the Datong–Xi'an Passenger Railway in Shaanxi, China
 Dali railway station (Yilan), on the TRA Yilan line in Toucheng, Yilan County, Taiwan